George "Gino" Iorgulescu (born 15 May 1956) is a Romanian former professional footballer who played as a defender. He is the current chairman of the Romanian Professional Football League.

Club career
Gino Iorgulescu was born on 15 May 1956 in Giurgiu, Romania and started to play junior level football at local club, Dunărea, making his debut for the senior squad in the 1973–74 Divizia B season. He was transferred alongside Dunărea teammate, Calianu at Sportul Studențesc București where he made his Divizia A debut under coach Angelo Niculescu on 31 August 1975 in a 1–1 against Universitatea Craiova, that being his only appearance in that season, being used more by Mircea Rădulescu at the team's youth squad and in the next season he was loaned at fellow Divizia A team, Progresul București where he made 28 appearances with 6 goals scored, afterwards returning at Sportul Studențesc when Rădulescu became the coach of the senior squad and used him more often. He spent the following 12 season at Sportul Studențesc, the highlights of this period being 12 goals scored in the 1977–78 season, helping the team earn a second position in the 1985–86 season, played in the 1979 Cupa României Final in the 3–0 loss in front of Steaua București, also helping the club win the 1979–80 Balkans Cup. Iorgulescu made his last Divizia A appearance on 20 June 1989 in a 2–1 victory of Sportul Studențesc in front of Argeș Pitești in which he scored a goal, having a total of 354 appearances and 55 goals scored in the competition, also having a total of 25 matches with four goals scored in the Cupa României and 14 games with two goals scored in the UEFA Cup, ending his playing career after being allowed by the communist regime to play abroad at Beerschot VAC for which he made only two appearances in the 1989–90 Belgian First Division.

International career
Gino Iorgulescu played 48 games and scored two goals at international level for Romania, making his debut on 11 November 1981 under coach Mircea Lucescu in a 0–0 against Switzerland at the 1982 World Cup qualifiers. He played in 7 games at the successful Euro 1984 qualifiers including a 1–0 victory in front of World Cup holders, Italy in which he had a praised performance after he annihilated his direct opponent Paolo Rossi and was used by coach Mircea Lucescu in a 1–1 against Spain and a 1–0 loss in front of Portugal at the final tournament as Romania did not pass the group stage. He played 7 games at the 1986 World Cup qualifiers in which he scored a goal in a 3–1 away victory against Turkey and he scored again in the following game, which was a friendly that ended 2–2 against Egypt in which he was the team's captain for the first time. Iorgulescu's last appearance for the national team took place on 8 October 1986 when coach Emerich Jenei sent him on the field in the 80th minute in order to replace Gheorghe Hagi in a 4–2 away victory in a friendly against Israel. 

For representing his country at the Euro 1984 final tournament, Iorgulescu was decorated by President of Romania Traian Băsescu on 25 March 2008 with the Ordinul "Meritul Sportiv" – (The Medal "The Sportive Merit") class III.

International goals
Scores and results list Romania's goal tally first, score column indicates score after each Iorgulescu goal.

After retirement
After he retired from his playing career, Gino Iorgulescu started working as an assistant at Romania's national team of Mircea Rădulescu in 1990, his coach from Sportul Studențesc. After Rădulescu was replaced with Cornel Dinu in 1991, Iorgulescu remained in Dinu's staff as a assistant, but they both left in June 1993 after the national team was defeated with 5–2 in Košice by Czechoslovakia at the 1994 World Cup qualifiers. From 1994 until 2005 Iorgulescu was president of Național București, a period in which the club finished three times as a runner-up in the Divizia A championship and reached the 1997 and 2003 Cupa României finals which were both lost, the first with 4–2 in front of Steaua București and the second with 1–0 in front of Dinamo București. During his presidency at Național București he was known as a trailblazer as he propelled at the team coaches like Walter Zenga, Roberto Landi or Cosmin Olăroiu and in 1999 he worked for a while as the team's head coach after José Ramón Alexanko left the club, leading the team in 13 rounds of the 1998–99 Divizia A season consisting of 6 victories, one draw and 6 losses, also he was in the center of a controversy when during a game against Rapid București which was lost with 3–1, he entered the field during the game and chased the referee Constantin Zotta as he felt disadvantaged by his way of refereeing. In 2000 Iorgulescu had a first attempt to become the president of the Romanian Professional Football League but lost in front of Dumitru Dragomir, however he ran again against Dragomir in 2013, this time winning the election.

Honours
Sportul Studențesc București
Balkans Cup (1): 1979–80, runner-up (1): 1976
Divizia A runner-up (1): 1985–86
Cupa României runner-up (1): 1978–79

Notes

References

External links

1956 births
Living people
People from Giurgiu
Romanian footballers
Olympic footballers of Romania
Liga I players
Liga II players
Liga III players
Belgian Pro League players
FC Sportul Studențesc București players
FC Progresul București players
K. Beerschot V.A.C. players
Romania international footballers
Expatriate footballers in Belgium
UEFA Euro 1984 players
Association football defenders
Romanian football managers
FC Progresul București managers
Romanian sports executives and administrators